Coconut milk powder is a fine, white powder used in Southeast Asian and other cuisines. Coconut milk powder is manufactured through the spray drying process of raw unsweetened coconut cream and is reconstituted with water for use in recipes that call for coconut milk. Many commercially available coconut milk powders list milk or casein among their ingredients.

See also
Powdered milk

Notes

Convenience foods
Food ingredients
 
Milk substitutes
Southeast Asian cuisine
Instant foods and drinks
Powdered drink mixes